The county of Suffolk is divided into five districts. The districts of Suffolk are Ipswich, East Suffolk, Mid Suffolk, Babergh, and West Suffolk.

As there are 800 Grade II* listed buildings in the county they have been split into separate lists for each district.

 Grade II* listed buildings in Babergh
 Grade II* listed buildings in Forest Heath
 Grade II* listed buildings in Ipswich
 Grade II* listed buildings in Mid Suffolk
 Grade II* listed buildings in St Edmundsbury (borough)
 Grade II* listed buildings in Suffolk Coastal
 Grade II* listed buildings in Waveney

See also
 Grade I listed buildings in Suffolk

References

 
Lists of listed buildings in Suffolk
Lists of Grade II* listed buildings in Suffolk